Masser is a surname. Notable people with the surname include:

 David Masser (born 1948), British Swiss mathematician
 Michael Masser (1941–2015), American songwriter, composer, and producer

See also
 Maaser Sheni, a Mitzvah instructing the Second Tithe be brought to Jerusalem